Tanikella Bharani (born 14 July 1954) is an Indian actor, screenwriter, poet, playwright and director who works predominantly in Telugu cinema. He has worked as an actor in more than 750 films, including some in Tamil and Hindi; while he was also screenwriter for 52 films. He has won three Andhra Pradesh State Nandi Awards.

Early life
Tanikella Bharani's ancestry includes poets and literary figures of Telugu literature. Diwakarla Venkatavadhani and Viswanatha Satyanarayana were his grand uncles. Divakarla Tirupati Sastry one of the Telugu poet duo Tirupati Venkata Kavulu was his great-grand-uncle.

He is born into a Telugu Brahmin family. He is fluent in Telugu, English, Hindi, Tamil.

He is a religious Hindu who is known for singing devotional songs in praise of Sri Shiva and Devi Parvati, and propagates to his fellow Hindus to not just read the Bhagavad Gita but to follow what it teaches.

Career
Tanikella did stage plays in the mid 70s and during this time he made the acquaintance of Rallapalli, a Tollywood actor. With his help Tanikella started writing small dialogues and stage scenes. Later, he took a diploma in Theatre arts. Following Rallapalli's advice he moved to Chennai.

He started his career as a dialogue writer for Kanchu Kavachum in 1984 and has written dialogues for various movies like Ladies Tailor (1985), Sri Kanaka Mahalakshmi Recording Dance Troupe (1987), Varasudochhadu (1988), Chettu Kinda Pleader (1989), Swara Kalpana (1989), Shiva (1989) and  Seenu Vasanthi Lakshmi (2004). He also penned and sung the lyrics of Gundamma Gaari Manavadu (Bhale Bhaleti Mandu).

He has acted in more than 750 movies starting with Ladies Tailor (1985) & Sri Kanaka Mahalakshmi Recording Dance Troupe (1987) in which he was seen as Dora Babu. In 1989 he appeared in the hit film Shiva, by Ram Gopal Varma, which starred Nagarjuna. With the release of the film Shiva, he received much recognition and his character Nanaji impressed the whole Telugu audience.

He also played a supporting role in the comedy film Bombay Priyudu in 1996. His powerful antagonism in Samudram won him the Nandi award as the Best Villain. After 2000, he started playing more mature roles in movies like Manmadhudu (2002), Okariki Okaru (2003), Samba (2004), Malliswari, Godavari (2006), and Happy (2006).

He directed Telugu Drama film Mithunam is a 2012 featuring S. P. Balasubrahmanyam and Lakshmi. He received CineMAA Award Special Jury Award for Best Direction for this film.

He wrote seven Telugu devotional songs song for the album "Nee Lona Shivudu Galudu, Na Lona Shivudu Galadu," literally translating as "The Lord Shiva in you and the Lord Shiva in me can rule the world." He also sang the title song for Nalona sivudu galadu and Shahabash Raa Shankara which were written by him.

Personal life 
He is married to Durga Bhavani in 1988. He resides in Yousufguda, Hyderabad. The couple has two children, Teja and Soundarya Lahari. Teja made his debut as an actor in the film Mr Lavangam (2012).

Awards 
Nandi Awards
Best Villain – Samudhram
Best Character Actor  – Nuvvu Nenu
Nandi Award for Best Dialogue Writer – Mithunam

Literary Awards
Sri Pada Subhramanya Sastry Literary Award – Polamuru
Bhanumathi Award – Hyderabad
Sri Vanamamalai Varadacharyulu Literary Award – Adilabad
Fellowship Jawahar Bharathi – Kavali
Allu Ramalingayyiah National Award – Hyderabad
Akkineni Swarna Kankanam – Hyderabad
Nagabhairava Koteswara Rao literary Award – Nellore

CineMAA Awards
Special Jury Award for Best Director – Mithunam (2013)

Sangam Academy Awards
Sangam Academy award for completing Twenty five years in Telugu Cinema

Awards for Short Films (as a Director)
Tenth Mumbai International Film Festival Award
Idaho Panhandle – Hyderabad International Film Festival Award for Sira-The Ink

Lok Nayak Foundation Sahitya Puraskar
Lok Nayak Foundation Sahitya Puraskar presented to Tanikella Bharani in Visakhapatnam.

Literary works
Books
Parikini
Nakshatra Darsanam
Maathralu
Endaro Mahanubavulu

Plays (Drama)
Jambu Dweepam
Kokkorokko
Chal Chal Gurram
Gaardhabhaandam
Gograhanam
 Naalugo Kothi

Playlets (Telugu)
Gaardhabhanda
Gograhanam
Kokkoroko
Chalchal Gurram
Jambudweepam
Grahanam Pattina Ratri
Sani Grahalu
Goyyi
Panjaram Lo Elaka
Hulakki

Song compositions
"Naalona Sividu Kaladu" is a composition of 7 songs written by Tanikella.
"Sabhash raa sankara!" Is composition by Tanikella about the concept of Shiva.
"Naamanasu Kothi raa Raama!"

Spiritual Books
Aata Gadaraa Siva
Sabhashuraa Sankara

Filmography

Telugu films
Actor

Writer

Dubbing artist

Tamil films

Hindi films

See also
 List of Indian writers

References

External links

 http://www.tanikellabharani.com
 
 http://twitter.com/TanikellaBharni

20th-century Indian male actors
Living people
1956 births
Telugu male actors
Telugu comedians
Telugu writers
Telugu-language writers
Andhra University alumni
20th-century Indian dramatists and playwrights
Indian male dramatists and playwrights
Telugu-language dramatists and playwrights
Male actors in Telugu cinema
Male actors in Tamil cinema
Male actors in Hindi cinema
Indian male film actors
Film directors from Hyderabad, India
Screenwriters from Hyderabad, India
Indian editors
Nandi Award winners
21st-century Indian male actors
Indian male comedians
People from Secunderabad
Male actors in Telugu theatre
Telugu film directors
21st-century Indian film directors
20th-century Indian male writers
21st-century Indian male writers